Rollinia occidentalis is a species of plant in the Annonaceae family. It is found in Argentina and Bolivia. It is threatened by habitat loss.

References

occidentalis
Flora of Bolivia
Flora of Argentina
Vulnerable flora of South America
Taxonomy articles created by Polbot